Pancratium illyricum is a species of bulbous plant native to Corsica, Sardinia and the Capraia Islands of Tuscany.

Pancratium illyricum grows on rocky slopes and sparse woodland areas, from sea level to more than 1300 m above sea level. It is a bulbous perennial with glaucous leaves, 30–60 cm long, 1½–½ cm wide. Leaves whither after flowering time, in early summer, and the plants goes dormant. The scape is up to 45 cm long, and the flowers are clustered in umbels of about 12, and are white with a short corona and very fragrant. Flowers appear in April to June. Pancratium canariense from the Canary Islands is very similar. It has broader leaves, longer flower-stalks and flowers in the autumn.

Etymology
The specific epithet illyricum means "from Illyria", a region in the western Balkans. It is not well suited as the plant does not grow there. The Italian name is "giglio stella" = star lily.

Cultivation
Easy to grow and flowers freely if planted near a south facing wall. Slow to increase. It is the hardiest Pancratium - USDA zone 8 and probably 7 in sheltered position with a southern aspect. Full sun in cooler climates, otherwise light shade. Propagation by seeds or division.

References

Phillips. R. and Rix. M. (1989) Bulbs'. Pan Books  
Polunin, Oleg (1987) Flowers of Greece and the Balkans - A Field Guide'' 

illyricum
Plants described in 1753
Taxa named by Carl Linnaeus
Flora of Italy
Flora of France
Flora of Corsica
Flora of Sardinia